Lieutenant General Balwant Singh Negi, PVSM, UYSM, YSM, SM, VSM & Bar is a former General Officer-Commanding-in-Chief (GOC-in-C), Central Command of the Indian Army who served in office from 1 December 2015 till 30 September 2018. He assumed the post after Lt General Rajan Bakshi retired and was succeeded by Lt General Abhay Krishna.

Early life and education 
Negi is an alumnus of Rashtriya Indian Military College, National Defence Academy and Indian Military Academy. He has completed the senior command course at Defence Service Staff College, Wellington; command & staff course in Bangladesh; higher command course at Army War College, Mhow and command course at National Defence College, New Delhi. He also holds a double MPhil in Strategic Studies and Defence Studies); a double master's degree in Defence Studies and a PhD in Strategic Studies from Madras University where his research topic was "China’s Modernisation and its implications".

Career 
Negi was commissioned into Assam Regiment on 16 December 1978. He has vast experience in North East India and Jammu & Kashmir. He has commanded a battalion on the Siachen Glacier, a brigade in Western Command, a Counter Insurgency Force in Jammu & Kashmir and Jharkhand & Bihar, XIV Corps (Leh). He has held command of many operations including Operation Meghdoot, Operation Vijay, Operation Rakshak, Operation Parakram, Operation Falcon, Operation Trident, Operations Sahayata I and II. He has also held staff appointments including He has held Colonel General Staff of an Infantry Division in Jammu & Kashmir during Operation Parakram; Commandant of the Indian Military Academy.

During 40 years of his career he has been awarded Yudh Seva Medal for Siachen in 1998; Sena Medal for Jammu & Kashmir in 2002; Vishisht Seva Medal twice for Jammu & Kashmir in 2009 and 2013; Uttam Yudh Seva Medal in 2016 and the Param Vishisht Seva Medal in January 2018. He has also been awarded with General Officer Commanding-in-Chief Commendation Card (twice) and Chief of Integrated Defence Staff Commendation Card.

Honours and decorations

Personal life 
He is an excellent sportsman with three Blues in Boxing and Gymnastics from National Defence Academy. He is also a keen equestrian track and Master of Fox Hounds for Ooty Hunt Club; has extensive trekking and motor biking experience in the Himalayas. on a 350cc Royal Enfield Motorcycle.

References 

Living people
Indian generals
Recipients of the Uttam Yudh Seva Medal
Indian Army personnel
Recipients of the Param Vishisht Seva Medal
Year of birth missing (living people)
Military personnel from Uttarakhand
National Defence College, India alumni
Commandants of Indian Military Academy
Recipients of the Yudh Seva Medal
Recipients of the Sena Medal
Recipients of the Vishisht Seva Medal
Army War College, Mhow alumni
Defence Services Staff College alumni